Anjimile Chithambo, better known under the mononym Anjimile, is an American folk musician from Boston, Massachusetts.

Early life and career 
Anjimile was born in 1993 and raised in Dallas before eventually moving to Boston. Growing up, they started playing guitar at 11, and sang in choirs starting in the fifth grade and continuing until college. Their early musical influence came through listening to their dad's Oliver Mtukudzi albums in the car, and early Sufjan Stevens. Later influences were getting sober and connecting with their Black Malawian roots. Anjimile identified as a lesbian for 10 years, before coming out as trans. They self-describe as "queer/trans/boy king" and use both they/them and he/him pronouns.

Anjimile began writing songs when they were a music industry student at Northeastern University, and wrote most of their most recent album Giver Taker while in rehab in Florida in 2016, where they got sober. In 2018, they entered NPR Music’s Tiny Desk Concert contest, and a panel from Boston affiliate WBUR named them the best entrant from Massachusetts. The following year, a Live Arts Boston grant from a pair of local non-profit foundations gave them the budget to make Giver Taker.  

The album was awarded one of the best 50 albums of 2020. Anjimile released their first full-length album in 2020 titled Giver Taker on Father/Daughter Records. According to Rolling Stone Magazine, Anjimile is an "artist you need to know" and their song "Baby No More" was a "Song You Need To Know" by the magazine. Anjimile was also Consequence of Sound's Artist of the Month". Prior to releasing the full-length album, Anjimile had self-produced and released numerous albums of their own.

Discography

As lead artist 
Giver Taker (Father/Daughter, 2020)
Reunion (Father/Daughter, 2021)

As featured artist 

 The Baby Reimagined (Grand Jury, 2021)
 How Many More Times (Father/Daughter, 2021)
 Why The Wild Things Are (HipStory 2019)

References

American folk musicians
Transgender singers
Non-binary singers
Musicians from Dallas
Musicians from Boston
Father/Daughter Records artists
LGBT African Americans
American LGBT singers
LGBT people from Texas
1993 births
Living people
21st-century American musicians
21st-century African-American musicians
21st-century American LGBT people